The 2013 Jeux de la Francophonie, also known as VIIèmes Jeux de la Francophonie (French for 7th Francophone Games), were held in Nice, France, from September 6–15. This was the second edition of the games to be hosted in France and the first time that a country hosted the games twice.

Participants
The list below is not complete. You can help by expanding it.

Events

Sports

  African wrestling
  Athletics
  Athletics (handicapped)
  Basketball
  Cycling
  Boxing
  Football (soccer)
  Judo
  Table tennis
  Wrestling
Ref

Cultural

Digital creation
Ecological creation
Hip-hop dance
Juggling
Poetry
Painting
Photography
Puppetry
Sculpture
Song
Storytelling
Traditional inspiration dance

Medal table

References

External links
Official site 
Official site (time keeper)
Games 2013 at  jeux.francophonie.org
Livre de resultats

 
Jeux De La Francophonie, 2013
Jeux De La Francophonie, 2013
Jeux de la Francophonie
International sports competitions hosted by France
Multi-sport events in France